Ice Cliff Glacier is in Wenatchee National Forest in the U.S. state of Washington, in a cirque to the northeast of Mount Stuart. Ice Cliff Glacier is along one of the many climbing routes to the summit of Mount Stuart, the second tallest non-volcanic peak in the state.

See also
List of glaciers in the United States

References

Glaciers of the North Cascades
Glaciers of Chelan County, Washington
Glaciers of Washington (state)